Fabian Mitchel Sporkslede (born 3 August 1993) is a Dutch footballer who plays as a right back for Bnei Sakhnin.

Club career

AFC Ajax
Sporkslede began his football career in the youth ranks of AZ Alkmaar, where he left to join the youth side of AFC Ajax in 2007. Working his way through the youth ranks of the Amsterdam side, Sporkslede would go on to make his debut for Ajax on 26 September 2012 in an away KNVB Cup match against FC Utrecht, which Ajax won by three goals to nil. Just three days after his debut, he made his regular season debut for Ajax, coming in as an 87th-minute substitute for Ryan Babel, in the 1–0 home win against FC Twente. Four days later, Sporkslede made his international debut for Ajax, coming on as a 69th-minute substitute for Christian Poulsen in the UEFA Champions League group stage match against Real Madrid at home. The match ended in a 1–4 loss for the Amsterdam side.

On 7 October 2012, in the home match against FC Utrecht, Sporkslede became the unfortunate record holder, as the youngest AFC Ajax player in Eredivisie history to score an own goal. At the age of 19 years and 65 days, he surpassed the former record holder by 50 days, which was held by the German Ajax player Werner Schaaphok, who scored an own goal at the age of 19 years and 115 days, in a match against ADO Den Haag on 16 April 1961. The top five youngest Ajax players to score an own goal is completed by Marciano Vink (19 years and 124 days), Frank Rijkaard (19 years and 136 days) and former Danish talent Jan Mølby (19 years and 140 days). The match against Utrecht ended in a 1–1 draw for Ajax, after the ball accidentally was played back into the own net of Ajax by Sporkslede in the 51st minute.

Willem II (loan)
On 10 July 2014, it was announced that Sporkslede was sent on loan to Willem II. He made his first league appearance coming on as a 71-minute substitute in the 2–1 away win against Feyenoord at De Kuip on 7 September 2014. On 23 September 2014, Sporkslede made his debut in the KNVB Cup match against Delta Sport which ended in a 2–1 loss for Willem II. His loan was ended during the Winter transfer window as Sporkslede had only played two matches since his arrival in July.

Return to Ajax
On 26 January 2015, it was announced that Fabian Sporkslede would return to Ajax, playing for the reserves team Jong Ajax in the Eerste Divisie, the 2nd tier of professional football in the Netherlands.

RKC Waalwijk
On 27 September 2019, he signed a contract for the 2019–20 season with RKC Waalwijk.

FC Dinamo Tbilisi
On 5 January 2021, he signed a 2-year contract with Dinamo Tbilisi.

Bnei Sakhnin
On 29 January 2022 signed for Bnei Sakhnin.

Personal life
Born in the Netherlands, Sporkslede is of Surinamese descent.

Career statistics

Club performance

Statistics accurate as of last match played on 28 October 2016.

Reserves performance

Statistics accurate as of last match played on 1 May 2015.

Honours

Club
Ajax
 Eredivisie (1): 2012–13

References

External links
 
Netherlands stats at OnsOranje

1993 births
Sportspeople from Amstelveen
Living people
Dutch footballers
Netherlands youth international footballers
Netherlands under-21 international footballers
Association football midfielders
AFC Ajax players
Jong Ajax players
Willem II (football club) players
A.C. ChievoVerona players
S.S. Racing Club Roma players
NAC Breda players
RKC Waalwijk players
FC Dinamo Tbilisi players
Bnei Sakhnin F.C. players
Eredivisie players
Eerste Divisie players
Serie A players
Serie C players
Erovnuli Liga players
Israeli Premier League players
Dutch expatriate footballers
Expatriate footballers in Italy
Expatriate footballers in Georgia (country)
Expatriate footballers in Israel
Dutch expatriate sportspeople in Italy
Dutch expatriate sportspeople in Georgia (country)
Dutch expatriate sportspeople in Israel
Dutch sportspeople of Surinamese descent
Footballers from North Holland